Suphisellus insularis is a species of burrowing water beetle in the subfamily Noterinae. It was described by Sharp in 1882 and is found in Cuba, the Dominican Republic, Guatemala, Haiti, Mexico, Puerto Rico and the United States.

References

Suphisellus
Beetles described in 1882